is a Japanese voice actress, narrator and singer who is currently affiliated with 81 Produce. She is also the main vocalist of Two-Mix and ES CONNEXION when it was active. Her uncle is a former New Japan Pro-Wrestling managing director Hisashi Shinma.

Takayama is best known for her roles in Kiki's Delivery Service as both Kiki and Ursula, Ranma ½ as Nabiki Tendo, Moomin as Moomin, Yaiba as Yaiba Kurogane, Shaman King as Hao Asakura, Nintama Rantarō as Rantarō Inadera, Danganronpa series as Hajime Hinata/Izuru Kamukura, Fullmetal Alchemist: Brotherhood as Envy and Detective Conan as Conan Edogawa.

Career
From an early age, Takayama studied ballet, Japanese dance, and vocal music. When she was a child, her sense of justice was so strong that it was written on her report card. She wanted to become a police officer, which she thought she was suited for, and she thought that ventriloquism would be necessary for being a traffic safety guider, so she joined Himawari Theatre Group in 1978 when she was in junior high school, and stayed there for four years. In reality, however, Takayama's parents wanted her to enter the entertainment industry, and she felt as if she was being forced to follow the rails laid out for her, and the ventriloquism was just a reason for her to study acting, not something she came up with. When she was in high school, she won a radio disc jockey contest and thought about becoming a DJ because of her love of radio and fascination with free banter and voice work.

After graduating from Adachi Nishi High School in Tokyo, not knowing how to become a DJ, Takayama enrolled in the theater department of Nihon Kogakuin College to continue her acting career, but she became worried about her future and dropped out to stop acting altogether. At one point, she was working at an office, but when a caller praised her voice, she decided to become a voice actor at the age of 22. In 1985, she joined the voice acting division of Sun House Music, but after that, she met a manager who asked her if she wanted to work as a voice actress, and she joined 81 Produce, where she was told that if she didn't make any progress in two of her three years as a rookie, she should give up. She decided to try to bear fruit in one year.

Initially, Takayama auditioned for the role of the heroine, but even though she tried to read the lines in a cute way, she was told by different sound directors to "be more like a girl." After failing three times in a row, she consulted with her manager and decided to audition for the role of a boy, thinking that heroine might not be suitable for her. She made her debut in 1987 as a female student in Campus Special Investigator Hikaruon. After that, she started getting boy roles and got her first starring role as Youichi Ajiyoshi in Mister Ajikko the third time around.

In 1989, she was chosen to play both Kiki and Ursula in the animated film Kiki's Delivery Service, and the film was a hit. She tried to refuse the role because it was decided at short notice and she was too new to take responsibility, but Hayao Miyazaki told her not to worry because he would take responsibility. Despite this, there was a time when the only regular role she played was Nabiki Tendo in the Ranma ½ series, which depressed her, but she pulled herself together and started working part-time in her neighborhood. In the 1990s, she began to play the main and major characters in many works, mainly boys, such as Moomin (as Moomin), Magical Taluluto (as Honmaru Edojō), and Yaiba (as Yaiba), and her popularity became firmly established. In particular, her leading roles as Rantarō Inadera in Nintama Rantarō and Conan Edogawa in Detective Conan have lasted for more than 20 years since they were first broadcast in 1993 and 1996, respectively, and Takayama's voice has become recognized by a wide range of generations. In 2005, she was chosen to play Suneo's mom in the renewed Doraemon anime, in 2007 she voiced Kitarō in the fifth series of GeGeGe no Kitarō, and in 2010 she voiced Taiki Kudō in Digimon Fusion.

Takayama is also active in music as ES CONNEXION, Two-Mix, Miru Takayama with TWO-MIX, and M★TWO-MinaMiru-, a unit with her cousin Miru Takayama. She has sung the theme songs of Mobile Suit Gundam Wing, and has also composed music. In the 81st episode of Detective Conan (broadcast on November 17, 1997), she appeared as a character with Shiina Nagano as TWO-MIX themselves, and also sang the opening theme song for the anime. In addition, in 2005, she brought in Joe Rinoie to work on the theme song for the anime Engage Planet Kiss Dum in 2007 as the unit II MIX⊿DELTA.

In 2011, Takayama won the Synergy Award at the 5th Seiyu Awards. On January 9, 2017, she was picked 7th in the TV Asahi 3-hour special that voted 200 popular voice actors.

Takayama was married to manga artist Gosho Aoyama on May 5, 2005 but they divorced on December 10, 2007. However, their relationship as "the author of the original story of Detective Conan and the lead voice actress" has continued to be good, and they are not estranged even now. Takayama has been keeping Aoyama's cat, Kite, which was given to her at the time of marriage, and she reports on Kite's good health on her blog.

During the opening speech of Detective Conan: Quarter of Silence an earthquake of magnitude 4 struck the stage. Takayama made a quick decision and said in Conan's voice, "Calm down, earthquakes! Don't worry, Conan is here." to calm the children.

Filmography

Television animation

Anime films

OVA

Dubbing roles

Tokusatsu

Video games

Drama CD

Original net Animation

References

External links
 81 Produce profile 
  
 
 

1964 births
Living people
Japanese women pop singers
Japanese video game actresses
Japanese voice actresses
Japanese contraltos
People from Adachi, Tokyo
Singers from Tokyo
Voice actresses from Tokyo
20th-century Japanese actresses
20th-century Japanese women singers
20th-century Japanese singers
21st-century Japanese actresses
21st-century Japanese women singers
21st-century Japanese singers
81 Produce voice actors